Philodoria wilkesiella is a moth of the family Gracillariidae. It was first described by Otto Swezey in 1940. It is endemic to the Hawaiian island of Maui.

Adults have a distinctive color pattern.

The larvae feed on Argyroxiphium grayana. They probably mine the leaves of their host plant.

External links

Philodoria
Endemic moths of Hawaii